or  is a French cake or quick bread. In Alsace, a considerable tradition incorporates a pinch of cinnamon.

Overview
The honey used was the dark buckwheat honey of Brittany. The Reims  industry was decimated by World War I.  The  of Dijon outpaced its older competitors in the Napoleonic era, and the bread is now considered one of the specialties of that city.

 was originally a sourdough bread without added leavening; it was left in a wooden trough to rest in a cool place for months, during which the honeyed rye flour experienced fermentation. When ready the dough was cooked in loaf moulds. The modern product usually rises with baking soda, or with baking powder, developed in the nineteenth century.

Because traditional  is sweetened entirely with honey, honey merchants in France often stock loaves of it for sale.  reserves the name  for  sweetened only with honey.

See also
 List of French desserts
 List of breads
 List of quick breads

References

French cakes
French breads
Sweet breads
Quick breads
Anise
Rye breads
Honey cakes